This article shows all participating team squads at the 2007 Volleyball America's Cup, held from August 15 to August 19, 2007, in Manaus, Brazil.

Head coach: Jon Uriarte

Head Coach: Bernardo Rezende

Head Coach: Glenn Hoag

Head Coach: Pedro Valdes

Head Coach: Jacinto Campechano

Head Coach: Hugh McCutcheon

References
 Volei

2007 in volleyball
S